Wiedemannia is the scientific name of two genera of organisms and may refer to:

Wiedemannia (fly), a genus of insects in the family Empididae
Wiedemannia (plant), a genus of plants in the family Lamiaceae